Phillips West is a neighborhood within the Phillips community in Minneapolis. Its boundaries are East 22nd Street to the north, Chicago Avenue to the east, East Lake Street to the south, and Interstate 35W to the west. The Phillips community has only been subdivided into smaller neighborhoods within the last couple years; the boundaries of Phillips West were officially designated on April 29, 2005. As this change has been fairly recent, most residents still refer to the area as just "Phillips".

The Phillips West Neighborhood Organization (PWNO) holds monthly community meetings (on the 1st Thursday of each month) and PWNO board meetings (on the 4th Monday of each month). The PWNO also plans and hosts the annual Phillips West Winter Social and National Night Out events and participates in the Phillips West and Phillips Clean Sweep events.

Demographics 
In 2020, Powderhorn Park had a population of about 6,700. 

 White 20.6%
 Black 46.2%
 American Indian and Alaska Natives 1.5%
 Asian 2.0%
 Hispanic 26.0%
 Other 0.3%
 Two or more 3.3%

References

http://phillipswest.info/

External links
Phillips West Neighborhood Organization
Phillips Neighbors Forum - Neighborhood e-mail list and forum including Midtown Phillips

Neighborhoods in Minneapolis